Derbyshire County Cricket Club in 1907 represents the cricket season when the English club Derbyshire had been playing for thirty six years. It was their thirteenth season in the County Championship and they finished bottom of the table having won two matches in the season.

1907 season

Derbyshire played 22 games in the County Championship, one match against the touring South Africans and one against MCC. They lost all but three of the played matches, which were two wins and a draw, and ended at the bottom of the Championship table.

Levi Wright was in his second season as captain and was also top scorer. Samuel Cadman  took most wickets with 63. The most outstanding bowling performance was by Frederick Bracey against Northamptonshire at Derby when he took eleven wickets for a total of 45 runs.

Those who made their debut in the 1907 season were  Henry Fletcher who also played two games in the following season,  FG Peach who played one match and then next appeared in 1920 with occasional appearances to 1925,  H Slater who played five matches only in the 1907 season and  Charles Fleming  and Charles Sherwin who each played one career first class match in 1907.

Matches

Statistics

County Championship batting averages

County Championship bowling averages

Wicket Keeper

J Humphries  Catches 36  Stumping 4

See also
Derbyshire County Cricket Club seasons
1907 English cricket season

References

1907 in English cricket
Derbyshire County Cricket Club seasons
English cricket seasons in the 20th century